Brooklyn is a former city in Alameda County, California, now annexed to Oakland, California.

Brooklyn first formed from the amalgamation in 1856 of two settlements, the sites of which are both now within the city limits of Oakland: San Antonio and Clinton. The name Brooklyn commemorated the ship that had brought Mormon settlers to California in 1846.  In 1870, Brooklyn absorbed the nearby town of Lynn, which housed a footwear industry, and incorporated as a city.  

The San Francisco and Oakland Railroad had built a station at San Antonio. When the Central Pacific Railroad took over the line in 1870, the name was changed to Brooklyn.

In 1872, voters approved their city's annexation by Oakland.  Afterward, when the Southern Pacific Railroad took over the rail line in 1883, the Brooklyn station name was changed to East Oakland.

A post office was opened in Brooklyn in 1855; it became a branch of the Oakland post office in 1878.

Looking at historical maps, Brooklyn is shown as a fairly large area, lying adjacent and to the south of Lake Merritt and the Piedmont tract, and adjacent and to the north of Alameda, the San Leandro Creek, and the town of San Leandro.  Today this is East Oakland.

References

External links
Brooklyn - Oakland Wiki

Former municipalities in California
Neighborhoods in Oakland, California
Populated places established in 1856
1872 disestablishments in California
1856 establishments in California